SEK Agiou Athanasiou is a Cypriot football club based in Ayios Athanasios, Limassol. Founded in 1956, was playing sometimes in Second and sometimes in the Third and Fourth Division.

Honours
 Cypriot Third Division:
 Champions (2): 2002, 2005
 Cypriot Fourth Division:
 Champions (1): 1997–98

References

Football clubs in Cyprus
Association football clubs established in 1948
1948 establishments in Cyprus